New Territories South constituency may refer to constituencies of Hong Kong in various years:
 South New Territories (1985 constituency)
 New Territories South (1991 constituency)
 New Territories South (1995 constituency)